Putri Pascualy is an author and credit strategist. She is the author of Investing in Credit Hedge Funds, a book focused on the topic of alternative investing in corporate credit markets.
 
Pascualy is a managing director for PAAMCO, an institutional investment firm focused on hedge funds.  Prior to joining PAAMCO in 2006, Pascualy was an economist with Cornerstone Research.  She speaks at industry panels and conferences, and her comments and contributions have appeared in The Wall Street Journal, Bloomberg News, and U.S. News & World Report.
 
Pascualy received undergraduate and MBA degrees from the Haas School of Business at the University of California, Berkeley.

References

21st-century American economists
21st-century American women writers
Haas School of Business alumni
Year of birth missing (living people)
Living people
Nationality missing
American economists
American women economists